Potentilla grandiflora  is a species of cinquefoil found in Monaco, Northern Italy, and Switzerland

References

External links
 
 

grandiflora